The 1860 United States presidential election in Massachusetts took place on November 2, 1860, as part of the 1860 United States presidential election. Voters chose 13 electors of the Electoral College, who voted for president and vice president.

Massachusetts was won by Republican candidate Abraham Lincoln, who won the state by 42.57%.

With 62.80% of the popular vote, Massachusetts would prove to be Lincoln's third strongest state in the 1860 election in terms of popular vote percentage after neighboring Vermont and Minnesota.

Results

See also
 United States presidential elections in Massachusetts

References

1860 Massachusetts elections
1860
Massachusetts